Volvo Baltic Race was a yacht race held in the Baltic Sea, sponsored by Volvo. It has been held in 2003 and 2004 as training series for VO60 yachts, targeting the Volvo Ocean Race.

2003
Seven yachts participated: 
Atea (1997–98 Whitbread Round the World Race Innovation Kvaerner), Challenge of Netsurvey (2001–02 Volvo Ocean Race Team News Corp), Elanders/Ten Celsius (1997–98 Whitbread Round the World Race Silk Cut), Nilörn (1993–94 Whitbread Round the World Race Winston), Pontona Youth (1997–98 Whitbread Round the World Race Heineken), RS (2001–02 Volvo Ocean Race Team SEB), SonyEricsson (Assa Abloy trial boat).

Legs

Results

2004
The 2004 Volvo Baltic Race, for the SEB Trophy was a three-week sprint version of Volvo Ocean Race. It was either taking part in, or be in port at the same time, as three of Northern Europe's biggest events: Kiel Week, Germany, the Swedish Match Cup in Marstrand, Sweden, and the Accenture Gotland Runt. Initiator was Viamare, the Swedish yacht and hotel conglomerate.

Five yachts participated: Avant (1997–98 Whitbread Round the World Race Swedish Match), AV-Teknik (1997–98 Whitbread Round the World Race Chessie Racing), JMS Next Generation (1997–98 Whitbread Round the World Race Silk Cut), SonyEricsson (2001–02 Volvo Ocean Race Assa Abloy), Team Elanders (2001–02 Volvo Ocean Race Team News Corp).

Legs

Results

References

See also
Volvo Ocean Race

Sailing competitions in Denmark
Sailing competitions in Germany
Sailing competitions in Sweden
Recurring sporting events established in 2003
Volvo
Defunct sailing competitions